Mohamed Dhaoui (born 14 May 2003) is a Tunisian professional footballer who plays as a winger for Egyptian club Al Ahly.

Career

Dhaoui started his career with Étoile du Sahel. In 2023, he signed for Al Ahly.

Career statistics

Club
.

References

External links

2003 births
Living people
Association football forwards
Tunisian footballers
Étoile Sportive du Sahel players
Al Ahly SC players
Tunisian Ligue Professionnelle 1 players
Egyptian Premier League players
Tunisian expatriate footballers
Expatriate footballers in Egypt
Tunisian expatriate sportspeople in Egypt